Dinko Antun Tomašić (1902–1975) was a Croatian sociologist and academic. He was born in Smokvica on the island of Korčula in Croatia. He studied law at the University of Zagreb and the University of Paris and taught in Zagreb. After his immigration to the United States ca. 1943, he became a member of the faculty at Indiana University. He also worked for the United States Air Force and for Radio Free Europe. Tomašić was the author of numerous publications on various aspects of the sociology of international relations.

Works
"The Impact of Russian Culture on Soviet Communism" Glencoe: Free Press, 1953, 
"Personality and Culture in Eastern European Politics" MIT Press, 1948, 
"An account on the reactions of a Serb village community in Croatia to recent social and ideological innovations" Institute of East European Studies, Indiana University, 1950, ASIN: B0006CZOFI
"The problem of unity of world communism" Marquette University, Slavic Institute, 1962, ASIN: B0006BT9Q4

External links
Cross-examination of Stjepan G. Meštrović - Cross-examination of Stjepan G. Meštrović at the International Criminal Trial for the former Yugoslavia discusses in part the work of Dinko Tomašić
 Sociology of Dinko Tomašić - Descriptions of some scholarly works about Tomašić.
 Violent Highlanders and Peaceful Lowlanders: Uses and Abuses of Ethno-Geography in the Balkans from Versailles to Dayton An essay including analysis of Tomašić's "Personality and Culture in Eastern European Politics"
  A "cultural interpretation of the collapse of Communism in the former  Yugoslavia" that frequently cites the work of Dinko Tomašić.

1902 births
1975 deaths
Croatian sociologists
Indiana University faculty
Radio Free Europe/Radio Liberty people
Yugoslav emigrants to the United States
Yugoslav expatriates in France